Edward Aloysius Murphy Jr. (January 11, 1918 – July 17, 1990) was an American aerospace engineer who worked on safety-critical systems. He is best known for his namesake Murphy's law, which is said to state, "Anything that can go wrong will go wrong".

History 
Born in the Panama Canal Zone in 1918, Murphy was the eldest of five children. After attending high school in New Jersey, he went to the United States Military Academy at West Point, graduating in 1940. The same year he accepted a commission into the United States Army, and undertook pilot training with the United States Army Air Corps in 1941. During World War II he served in the Pacific Theater, India, China and Burma (now known as Myanmar), achieving the rank of major.

Following the end of hostilities, in 1947 Murphy attended the United States Air Force Institute of Technology, becoming R&D Officer at the Wright Air Development Center of Wright-Patterson Air Force Base. It was while here that he became involved in the high-speed rocket sled experiments (USAF project MX981, 1949) which led to the coining of Murphy's law. Murphy himself was reportedly unhappy with the commonplace interpretation of his law, which is seen as capturing the essential "cussedness" of inanimate objects. Murphy regarded the law as crystallizing a key principle of defensive design, in which one should always assume worst-case scenarios. Murphy was said by his son to have regarded the many jocular versions of the law as "ridiculous, trivial and erroneous". 

In 1952, having resigned from the United States Air Force, Murphy carried out a series of rocket acceleration tests at Holloman Air Force Base, then returned to California to pursue a career in aircraft cockpit design for a series of private contractors. He worked on crew escape systems for some of the most famous experimental aircraft of the 20th century, including the F-4 Phantom II, the XB-70 Valkyrie, the SR-71 Blackbird, the B-1 Lancer, and the X-15 rocket plane. During the 1960s, he worked on safety and life support systems for Project Apollo, and ended his career with work on pilot safety and computerized operation systems on the Apache helicopter.

In popular culture
In the Disney Channel animated series Milo Murphy's Law, the protagonist Milo Murphy is said to be a descendant of Edward A. Murphy. As a consequence of this, perils befall his every action, in keeping with Murphy's law.

References

1918 births
1990 deaths
American aerospace engineers
Aviators from the Panama Canal Zone
United States Military Academy alumni
United States Army personnel of World War II
Zonians
Air Force Institute of Technology alumni
20th-century American engineers